Union Creek is an unincorporated community in Jackson County in the U.S. state of Oregon. The community is home to the Union Creek Historic District, which has been listed on the National Register of Historic Places since 1980.

The community is named after the creek, which in turn took its name from Union Peak in the national park. A Union Creek post office was established in 1924 and ceased operations in 1942, although it did not formally close until 1945. Helen C. Herriott was the first postmaster.

References 

Unincorporated communities in Jackson County, Oregon
Unincorporated communities in Oregon